NGC 679 is an elliptical or a lenticular galaxy located 210 million light-years away in the constellation Andromeda. The galaxy was discovered by astronomer William Herschel on September 13, 1784 and is a member of Abell 262.

It is also a radio galaxy.

Dust Disk
NGC 679 hosts a nearly face-on disk of dust with a diameter of ~.

See also
 List of NGC objects (1–1000)

References

External links

679
1283
6711
Andromeda (constellation)
Astronomical objects discovered in 1784
Elliptical galaxies
Abell 262
Lenticular galaxies
Radio galaxies